The kama-yari (鎌槍, sickle spear) is essentially a yari with horizontal kama (blade) at the base of the vertical blade to assist in grappling an opponent. Generally, the transverse blade, or hook, is large enough to hold the head, neck, or jaw or to grapple with the limbs of an opponent.  It is different in function from other types of yari. The kama-yari was often used to hook horsemen and dismount them.

Historically, it also had a non-military use, in which it was employed by firefighters to pull down the roofs of burning buildings to slow a fire, much the same way modern firefighters use a pike pole.

The kama-yari is believed to have been developed by Kakuzenbo Hoin In’ei, who wanted to improve upon the naginata used by Buddhist priests at the time.

References

Spears of Japan
Samurai polearms